Lisa Codrington is a Canadian character actress and playwright. She is most noted for her role as Gail on the comedy series Letterkenny and her theatrical plays Cast Iron, which was a nominee for the Governor General's Award for English-language drama at the 2006 Governor General's Awards, and Up the Garden Path, which won the Carol Bolt Award in 2016.

Early life and education 
She studied criminology and theatre at the University of Winnipeg and acting at the Ryerson Theatre School.

Career 
Codrington wrote Cast Iron as a one-woman show about her Barbadian heritage, and won a five-month workshop when she submitted a draft of the play to the Write from the Hop competition. The play premiered at Toronto's Tarragon Theatre in 2005, with Alison Sealy-Smith in the lead role. Her later plays have included The Aftermath (2011), The Adventures of the Black Girl in Her Search for God (2016) and Up the Garden Path.

As an actress, Codrington also played Shelley in the series Bad Blood and has had supporting roles in the television series Copper, Heroes Reborn, Man Seeking Woman, The Handmaid's Tale, Saving Hope, Alias Grace, Cardinal, What Would Sal Do?, Schitt's Creek, Anne with an E, Little Dog and Children Ruin Everything, and stage roles in productions of Da Kink in My Hair, A Midsummer Night's Dream and Binti's Journey.

Filmography

Film

Television

References

External links

21st-century Canadian actresses
21st-century Canadian dramatists and playwrights
21st-century Canadian women writers
Black Canadian actresses
Black Canadian writers
Canadian television actresses
Canadian film actresses
Canadian stage actresses
Canadian women dramatists and playwrights
Canadian people of Barbadian descent
Living people
Year of birth missing (living people)